The Greens at North Hills Municipal Golf Course is a municipal golf course located in Sherwood, Arkansas, United States. Construction of the  golf course began in 1927 during the "golden era" of golf course design.

Originally named the Sylvan Hills Country Club Golf Course and developed by the Justin Matthews Co., the course was added to the National Register of Historic Places in 2010 due to its local significance and association with entertainment and recreation, From 1956 through May 2007, the golf course was named the North Hills Country Club.

References

External links 
 The Greens at North Hills website

Sources 
 Bradburn, Cary. On the Opposite Shore: The Making of North Little Rock. Marceline, MO: Walsworth Publishing Company, 2004.
 Robert. L.A Adams, and John F. Ronney, Jr., "Evolution of American Golf Facilities," Geographical Review 75. Oct. 1985.
 Metropolitan Trust Company, "We Recommend for Investment" In the files of the Arkansas Historic Preservation Program.
 Pulaski County Deed Record Book 324, pg. 497
 Pulaski County: Warranty Deed #51109; 3-19-1927.

1927 establishments in Arkansas
Sherwood, Arkansas
Sports venues completed in 1927
Golf clubs and courses in Arkansas
National Register of Historic Places in Pulaski County, Arkansas
Sports venues on the National Register of Historic Places in Arkansas
Golf clubs and courses on the National Register of Historic Places